Gemmatimonas is a Gram-negative, rod-shaped, motile and non-spore-forming genus of bacteria from the family of Gemmatimonaceae.

References

Further reading
 

Gemmatimonadota